The District Attorney of Queens County is the elected district attorney for Queens County in New York State, coterminous with the New York City borough of Queens. The office is responsible for the prosecution of violations of New York state laws. (Federal law violations in Queens are prosecuted by the U.S. Attorney for the Eastern District of New York). The current Queens County District Attorney is Melinda Katz, who assumed the duties of the office on January 1, 2020. There was an inauguration on January 6, 2020 at her alma mater, St. Johns University.

History
In a legislative act of February 12, 1796, New York State was divided into seven districts, each with its own Assistant Attorney General. Queens County was part of the First District, which also included Kings, Richmond, Suffolk, and Westchester counties. (At that time, Queens County included much of present-day Nassau County, and Westchester County included present-day Bronx County.) In 1801, the office of Assistant Attorney General was renamed District Attorney. At the same time, New York County was added to the First District. Westchester County was separated from the First District in 1813, and New York County was separated in 1815. In 1818, all 13 districts were broken up, and each county in the State of New York became a separate district.

Until 1822, the district attorney was appointed by the Council of Appointment, and held the office "during the Council's pleasure", meaning that there was no defined term of office. Under the provisions of the State Constitution of 1821, the D.A. was appointed to a three-year term by the County Court. Under the provisions of the State Constitution of 1846, the office became elective by popular ballot. The term was three years, beginning on January 1 and ending on December 31. In case of a vacancy, the Governor of New York filled the vacancy temporarily until a successor was elected, always to a full term, at the next annual election.

One year after the 1898 Consolidation of New York City, Nassau County was separated from Queens County. In case of a vacancy, a DA is appointed by the Governor to fill the office temporarily.   A new DA is then elected at the next annual election in November, always to a full term. From 1847 to 1942, the term length was three years. In November 1942, a DA was elected to a one-year term.  From the election of November 1943, the DA has been elected to a four-year term.

List of district attorneys

References

External links